A list of films produced in Egypt in 1951. For an A-Z list of films currently on Wikipedia, see :Category:Egyptian films.

External links
 Egyptian films of 1951 at the Internet Movie Database
 Egyptian films of 1951 elCinema.com

Lists of Egyptian films by year
1951 in Egypt